The 2007 FA Cup can refer to:
FA Cup 2006-07
FA Cup 2007-08